Masagos Zulkifli bin Masagos Mohamad (Jawi: ماسڬوس ذوالكفل; born 1963) is a Singaporean politician who has been serving as Minister for Social and Family Development and Second Minister for Health since 2020, Minister-in-charge of Muslim Affairs. A member of the governing People's Action Party (PAP), he serves as the Vice Chairman in the party Central Executive Committee (CEC), and had been the Member of Parliament (MP) representing the Tampines West division of Tampines GRC since 2006. 

Before joining politics, Masagos was an electrical engineer and had held key positions in Singtel. He made his debut in the political scene after winning the 2006 general election as part of a five-member PAP team contesting in Tampines GRC. Since then, he has won three subsequent elections and has held various positions in the ministries of Home Affairs, Foreign Affairs and Health. On 9 April 2015, Masagos was appointed Minister in the Prime Minister's Office. His appointment marked the first time in Singaporean history when there were two Malay ministers in the Cabinet. On 1 October 2015, Masagos took up the portfolio of Minister for Environment and Water Resources.

Background 
Masagos was educated at Bukit Panjang Government High School and National Junior College before he went to Nanyang Technological University, where he graduated in 1988 with a Bachelor of Engineering (First Class Honours), majoring in electrical and electronic engineering. In 1994, he obtained a Master of Science in electrical engineering from the National University of Singapore. His first job was with Singtel in 1988. In 1995, he completed a Master of Business Administration at the University of Southern California on a postgraduate scholarship awarded by Singtel. He was later appointed Chief Executive Officer of SingTel Global Offices.

Political career 
Masagos made his debut in politics in the 2006 general election when he contested as part of a five-member People's Action Party team in Tampines Group Representation Constituency (GRC). The PAP team won about 68% of the vote, and Masagos became a Member of Parliament representing the Tampines West ward of Tampines GRC. He was subsequently appointed Senior Parliamentary Secretary in the Ministry of Education on 2 June 2006, and concurrently Senior Parliamentary Secretary in the Ministry of Home Affairs on 1 April 2008. On 1 November 2010, he was promoted to Minister of State in these two ministries.

Masagos was re-elected in Tampines GRC in the 2011 general election. On 21 May 2011, he was appointed Minister of State for Home Affairs and Foreign Affairs. On 1 August 2012, he was promoted to Senior Minister of State in these two ministries.

On 9 April 2015, Masagos was promoted to the rank of full Minister but did not have a portfolio yet, so he was a Minister in the Prime Minister's Office. This was the first time in Singaporean history when there were two Malay ministers in the Cabinet, the other being Yaacob Ibrahim. Masagos was also promoted to Second Minister for Home Affairs and Second Minister for Foreign Affairs, and was put in charge of leading the PAP team in Tampines GRC. On the same day, Prime Minister Lee Hsien Loong said that Masagos's elevation to full Minister reflected the "progress of the Malay community" in Singapore. Masagos also said that he was honoured to have been appointed and that "[h]aving two Malay full ministers in the Cabinet for the first time in our nation's history reflects the [Government's] trust and recognition of the good progress made by the Malay-Muslim community".

On 1 October 2015, Masagos took up the portfolio of Minister for Environment and Water Resources. From 1 May 2018, he was given an additional appointment as Minister-in-charge of Muslim Affairs, taking over from Yaacob Ibrahim. On 27 July 2020, he changed his portfolio to Minister for Social and Family Development and took up an additional portfolio as Second Minister for Health, while concurrently holding the position of Minister-in-charge of Muslim Affairs.

References

External links

 Masagos Zulkifli on Prime Minister's Office
 Masagos Zulkifli on Parliament of Singapore

 

1963 births
Living people
Marshall School of Business alumni
Members of the Cabinet of Singapore
Members of the Parliament of Singapore
Nanyang Technological University alumni
National Junior College alumni
National University of Singapore alumni
People's Action Party politicians
Singaporean Muslims
Singaporean people of Malay descent
Environment ministers
Environment ministers of Singapore